David Le Bras (born 4 October 1983 in La Fleche in France) is a French football player, who currently plays for Phrae United F.C., Division 2 in Thailand.

Career
After professional football school in Stade Rennais F.C. he went to several countries, Belgium, Finland, Switzerland in Europe and Malaysia, Thailand in Asia.

Clubs
1989–1996: AS Saint-Pierre Montrevault (France)
1996–2003: Stade Rennais F.C. (France)
2003–2004: KSK Beveren (Belgium)
2004–2005: FCV Dender EH (Belgium)
2005–2006: FC Lorient (France)
2006–2007: PP-70 (Finland)
2007: BEC Tero Sasana FC (Thailand)
2008: Chonburi FC (Thailand)
2008: Kelantan FA (Malaysia)
2009: FC Kreuzlingen (Switzerland)
2009: Urania Genève Sport – (Switzerland)
2010–2012: Nakhon Ratchasima F.C. (Thailand)
2013:Rayong United F.C., Air Force Central F.C.(Thailand)
2014: Sa Kaeo F.C. (Thailand)
2015: Saraburi TRU F.C. (Thailand)
2016: Phrae United F.C. (Thailand)
2017: Nakhon Nayok F.C. (Thailand) 
2018:End of career.

Position
He played as offensive midfielder

External links
 Official Site David Le Bras
 comprehensive Interview

French footballers
Expatriate footballers in Thailand
1983 births
Living people
Urania Genève Sport players
Association football forwards
FC Kreuzlingen players